Pristimantis mnionaetes is a species of frog in the family Strabomantidae.
It is endemic to Colombia.
Its natural habitat is tropical moist montane forests.
It is threatened by habitat loss.

References

mnionaetes
Endemic fauna of Colombia
Amphibians of Colombia
Amphibians of the Andes
Amphibians described in 1998
Taxonomy articles created by Polbot